The Men's Javelin Throw athletics events for the 2012 Summer Paralympics took place at the London Olympic Stadium from September 1 to September 8. A total of 8 events were contested incorporating 14 different classifications.

Schedule

Results

F12/13

F33-F34

F40

F42

F44

F52-F53

F54-56

F57-58

References

Athletics at the 2012 Summer Paralympics
2012 in men's athletics